Solway Community School is a mixed secondary school located in Silloth in the English county of Cumbria.

It is a comprehensive community school administered by Cumbria County Council. Solway Community School offers GCSEs and vocational courses as programmes of study for pupils.

The school previously held specialist status as a Technology College, and was called Solway Community Technology College during this period.

Notable former pupils
John O'Neil, former rugby player

References

External links
Solway Community School official website

Secondary schools in Cumbria
Community schools in Cumbria
Silloth